Sai is a village in the Bhiwani district of the Indian state of Haryana. , the village had 1,141 households with a population of 6,080 of which 3,241 were male and 2,839 female.

References

Villages in Bhiwani district